The Itacaiúnas River is a river of Pará state in north-central Brazil.

Part of the river basin is in the Tapirapé-Aquiri National Forest, a  sustainable use conservation unit created in 1989.

See also
List of rivers of Pará

References

Brazilian Ministry of Transport

Rivers of Pará